Großes Moor (German for "Great Bog" or "Great Moor") may refer to:

 Bogs or moorland areas in Germany
 Großes Moor (near Becklingen), a nature reserve near Bergen, Celle county, Lower Saxony
 , a nature reserve near Tostedt, Harburg county, Lower Saxony
 Großes Moor (Vechta-Diepholz), on either side of the boundary between the counties of Vechta, Diepholz and Osnabrück, Lower Saxony 
 , near Uchte, Nienburg/Weser county, Lower Saxony
 Großes Moor (near Gifhorn), near Neudorf-Platendorf, Gifhorn county, Lower Saxony
 Großes Moor near Hausen (Rhön), Rhön-Grabfeld county, Bavaria
 Großes Moor near Dätgen, Rendsburg-Eckernförde county, Schleswig-Holstein
 Großes Torfmoor, bei Hille, Minden-Lübbecke county, North Rhine-Westphalia
 a former name of the heath moor or Rendswühren Moor near Rendswühren, Schleswig-Holstein

 Other meanings 
 Großes Moor (lake), a lake in the municipality of Hohenfelde, Mecklenburg-Western Pomerania, Germany
 Altstadt (Schwerin), the oldest residential area in the Old Town of the Mecklenburg-Western Pomeranian capital of Schwerin

See also 
 :de:Großes Moor, a disambiguation page in German Wikipedia